Koenker is a surname. Notable people with the surname include:

Deborah Koenker (born 1949), Canadian artist
Mark Koenker (born 1947), Canadian politician
Roger Koenker (born 1947), American econometrician